The Iglesia San Germán de Auxerre is a historic Roman Catholic parish church located in San Germán, Puerto Rico, overlooking the main plaza of the town. Spanish settlers founded San Germán parish in 1510 and built the first permanent church in 1688. The church was repaired and reconstructed between 1717 and 1739 after it suffering earthquake damage. Between 1834 and 1897, new repairs were made to the building, and in 1920, the tower was rebuilt after the 1918 earthquake. With trompe-l'œil painting that imitates wood coffers on the ceiling, the Church of San Germán's interior is one of the most lavishly decorated on the island.  The vault and arches are painted in the trompe-l'œil manner. The church conserves the 1869 marble altar as well as ten other 19th century smaller secondary marble altars. A collection of 17th century metalwork, 18th century wooden carvings and a painting by José Campeche are kept in the choir loft. It was listed on the National Register of Historic Places in 1984.

Gallery

See also
 Porta Coeli
 San Germán Historic District
List of the oldest buildings in Puerto Rico

References

Buildings and structures in San Germán, Puerto Rico
San German de Auxerre
Spanish Colonial architecture in Puerto Rico
Historic district contributing properties in Puerto Rico
Roman Catholic churches completed in 1688
17th-century establishments in Puerto Rico
1688 establishments in New Spain